Alexander Lamont Monteith (15 December 1886 – 24 November 1972) was a New Zealand Member of Parliament for the Labour Party and a trade unionist.

Biography

Early life and career
Monteith was born in Woodville, the son of Sarah Ann Monteith (née Carter) and Charles Forrester Monteith, and was a farmer and storeman. He was secretary of the United Storemen's Union and later secretary of the Wellington Tramways Union and the New Zealand Tramway Workers' Federation.

Political career

In 1918, Monteith was nominated by the Soft Goods and Storeman's Union for the Labour nomination in the Wellington South by-election, but was defeated by Bob Semple.

In the 1922 election, he was one of four candidates, with Thomas Forsyth of the Reform Party coming second. Monteith was also a member of the Wellington City Council from 1923 until 1926 when he resigned.

Later life and death
For 21 years, from 1926 to 1947, the worker's assessor at New Zealand's Arbitration Court.

Monteith died on 24 November 1972 at Green Lane Hospital in Auckland, survived by five sons and two daughters. He had been admitted to hospital five weeks earlier after suffering a stroke.

Notes

References

Ministers and Members in the New Zealand Parliament Edited by G.A. Wood (1996, Otago University Press, Dunedin)

|-

|-

1886 births
1972 deaths
New Zealand Labour Party MPs
Wellington City Councillors
New Zealand farmers
New Zealand trade unionists
People from Woodville, New Zealand
Unsuccessful candidates in the 1925 New Zealand general election
Unsuccessful candidates in the 1919 New Zealand general election
Members of the New Zealand House of Representatives
New Zealand MPs for Wellington electorates